Thomas A. Shillue (born June 13, 1966) is an American stand-up comedian, actor, author, and talk-show host from Norwood, Massachusetts. He was a correspondent on The Daily Show on Comedy Central and hosted Red Eye on Fox News. He has been a supporting cast member on Fox News' Gutfeld! (formerly called The Greg Gutfeld Show) since the show premiered in 2015. He released his first book, Mean Dads for a Better America: The Generous Rewards of an Old-Fashioned Childhood,  in 2017.  In June 2017, Shillue began hosting a weekday afternoon three-hour syndicated talk radio show on Fox News Radio, also heard on Sirius XM's Fox News Talk Channel 450.

Television and film
Shillue appears regularly on Late Night with Jimmy Fallon as a member of the "Ragtime Gals", a barbershop quartet that also includes Jimmy Fallon, which performs pop songs in a barbershop style; examples include singing "SexyBack" along with Justin Timberlake and "Roxanne" along with Sting. Shillue is also a cast member on Fox News' popular late-night show, Gutfeld!, notable for his parodies of Joe Biden and Adam Schiff. Shillue has appeared with Conan O'Brien doing stand up. He appeared in the film Mystery Team by Derrick Comedy in 2009.  His television acting work includes guest spots on programs like Spin City, Broad City and Law & Order.

A correspondent on The Daily Show, since 2014, Shillue has subbed in for Greg Gutfeld, co-hosting The Five. Shillue served as the permanent host of Red Eye from June 22, 2015, when Gutfeld left to host his new show Gutfeld!, until Red Eye was cancelled in April 2017. Shillue remains a contributor on the Fox News Channel. Soon after Red Eye was cancelled, Shillue joined Gutfeld! as a permanent cast member, though he had been making appearances on the show as early as 2015.

Stand-up and theatre

Shillue performs frequently as an opening act for Jim Gaffigan. He also performed a two-man show along with Gaffigan in the late 1990s called The North American White Male.

During the Clinton-Starr-Lewinsky scandal, Tom Shillue appeared as Harry Truman, Lyndon Johnson, John Kennedy and the title character, Ken Starr, in Eric Zaccar's Social Satire for the Stage, Starr’s On Broadway.      

Shillue has performed solo shows including Supernormal at PS122 and Dad 2.0 at Ars Nova Theatre.

Other work
Shillue announced his 12 in 12 project, whereby he would release an album of new material each month from November 2012 to October 2013. Some viewers of Red Eye believed the promotion of these new albums was simply a running gag on the show, a misconception which Shillue and Gutfeld dispelled on air, leading to a spike in sales.

On April 25, 2017, Shillue, along with TV's Andy Levy began hosting Fox News Radio from 6 pm to 9 pm Eastern. On July 10, 2017, Shillue started as the host of the "Tom Shillue Show" from 3 pm to 6 pm eastern time on Fox News Radio.

In 2019, Tom Shillue served as the host of "The Quiz Show" on Fox Nation.

In the fall of 2019,  Tom Shillue began doing humorous impressions of Democratic Representative and Chairman of the Congressional Intelligence Committee Adam Schiff on The Greg Gutfeld Show regarding the impeachment of President Donald Trump; examples of which can be found on various YouTube channels. In January 2020, Shillue started doing impressions of Democratic presidential candidate and former Vice President Joe Biden on The Greg Gutfeld Show. On Gutfeld! he appears as "President Biden" and "Angry White Male."

Awards
 ECNY Award Best Storyteller 2011
 ECNY Award Best One Person Show 2010

References

External links
 Official Site
 

Living people
American stand-up comedians
1966 births
People from Norwood, Massachusetts
Fox News people
21st-century American writers
21st-century American comedians